Roberto Goyeneche (January 29, 1926 in Saavedra, Autonomous City of Buenos Aires – August 27, 1994 in Buenos Aires) was an Argentine tango singer of Basque descent, who epitomized the archetype of 1950s Buenos Aires' bohemian life, and became a living legend in the local music scene.

He was known as El Polaco ("the Pole") due to his blond hair, and thinness, like the Polish immigrants of the time. He is identified with the neighborhood of Saavedra, where he grew up.

Career 
Roberto Goyeneche was formed in the style of the tango of Carlos Gardel, later reached a more personal style characterised by his particular way of phrasing with rubato. In 1944, at the age of 18, he joined Raúl Kaplún's orchestra after winning a local contest and soon gave his live debut performance on Radio Belgrano. In 1952 Goyeneche teamed up with Horacio Salgán.

In 1956, he became the singer in the orchestra of his dear friend Aníbal Troilo, with whom he recorded 26 songs. Later, Goyeneche became the first singer to record Ástor Piazzolla's classic Balada Para Un Loco, after starting his solo career in 1963.

During the 1980s, Goyeneche appeared as special guest in the movies El exilio de Gardel and Sur, both directed by Fernando Solanas.

At the time of his death on 27 August 1994 in Buenos Aires (Aged 68), he was considered the greatest tango singer active. As a  tribute, an avenue in the neighborhood of Saavedra, in Buenos Aires, is named after him.

References

External links 
 Roberto Goyeneche at todotango.com
 Roberto Goyeneche at tango.info

1926 births
1994 deaths
Singers from Buenos Aires
Argentine people of Basque descent
Argentine tango musicians
20th-century Argentine male singers
Tango singers
Burials at La Chacarita Cemetery